Tway is an unincorporated community in  Harlan County, Kentucky, United States. Its post office is closed.

Notable people
Green Wix Unthank, United States District Court judge

References

Unincorporated communities in Harlan County, Kentucky
Unincorporated communities in Kentucky
Coal towns in Kentucky